Bardouville is a commune in the Seine-Maritime department in the Normandie region in north-western France.

Geography

Population

Places of interest
 The Château du Corset-Rouge, dating from the nineteenth century.
 The church of St.Michel, dating from the eleventh century.

Twin Cities 
 Les Planchettes, Switzerland.

See also
Communes of the Seine-Maritime department

References

External links

Some photos of the commune

Communes of Seine-Maritime